Marie Maynard Daly (April 16, 1921October 28, 2003) was an American biochemist. She was the first African-American to receive a Ph.D. from Columbia University and the first African-American woman in the United States to earn a Ph.D. in chemistry. Daly made important contributions in four areas of research: the chemistry of histones, protein synthesis, the relationships between cholesterol and hypertension, and creatine's uptake by muscle cells.

Education
Daly attended Hunter College High School, a laboratory high school for girls ran by Hunter College faculty, where she was also encouraged to pursue chemistry. She then enrolled in Queens College, a small, fairly new school in Flushing, New York. She lived at home to save money and graduated magna cum laude from Queens College with her bachelor's degree in chemistry in 1942. Upon graduation, she was named a Queens College Scholar, an honor that is awarded to the top 2.5% of the graduating class.

Labor shortages and the need for scientists to support the war effort enabled Daly to garner fellowships to study at New York University and Columbia University for her master's and Ph.D. degrees, respectively.

Daly worked as a laboratory assistant at Queens College while studying at New York University for her master's degree in chemistry, which she completed in 1943. She became a chemistry tutor at Queens College and enrolled in the doctoral program at Columbia University, where she was supervised by Mary Letitia Caldwell, for a Ph.D. thesis titled, "A Study of the Products Formed By the Action of Pancreatic Amylase on Corn Starch" and received her Ph.D. in chemistry in 1947. She was the first African American to receive a Ph.D. from Columbia University and the first African American woman to receive a chemistry Ph.D. in the United States.

Career
Daly worked as a physical science instructor at Howard University, from 1947 to 1948 while simultaneously conducting research under the direction of Herman Branson. After being awarded an American Cancer Society grant to support her postdoctoral research, she joined Alfred E. Mirsky's group at the Rockefeller Institute, which studied the cell nucleus and its constituents. This was the start of a seven-year research program at the Rockefeller Institute of Medicine, where Daly examined how proteins are constructed in the body. At the time, the structure and function of DNA were not yet understood.

Daly began working in the College of Physicians and Surgeons at Columbia University in 1955. In collaboration with Quentin B. Deming, she studied arterial metabolism.
She continued this work as an assistant professor of biochemistry and of medicine at the Albert Einstein College of Medicine at Yeshiva University, where she and Deming moved in 1960. 
From 1958 to 1963, she also served as an investigator for the American Heart Association.

During her final years at Albert Einstein College, per Daly's efforts to increase minority enrollment in professional and graduate schools, she helped run the Martin Luther King -Robert F. Kennedy program to help prepare black students for admission. In 1971 she was promoted to associate professor. 

In 1975, Daly was one of 30 minority women scientists to attend a conference examining the challenges facing minority women in STEM fields. The conference was held by the American Association for the Advancement of Science. This resulted in the publication of the report, The Double Bind: The Price of Being a Minority Woman in Science (1976) which made recommendations for recruiting and retaining minority women scientists.

Daly was a member of the board of governors of the New York Academy of Sciences for two years. She was a fellow of the American Association for the Advancement of Science and of the American Cancer Society.   Daly was designated as a career scientist by the Health Research Council of the City of New York.

Daly retired in 1986 from the Albert Einstein College of Medicine, and in 1988 established a scholarship for African American chemistry and physics majors at Queens College in memory of her father. In 1999, she was recognized by the National Technical Association as one of the top 50 women in Science, Engineering and Technology.

Research

Histones
Daly was particularly interested in nuclear proteins. She developed methods for the fractionation of nuclear material and the determination of its composition. It was essential to separate cellular material into all of its components, without destroying or losing any of them.

She studied histones, proteins found in cell nuclei, and was able to show the amino acid composition of various histone fractions. Her studies of histones with Mirsky provided evidence for lysine-rich histones, in contrast to the arginine-rich histones described by Albrecht Kossel.
Histones have since been shown to be important in gene expression.
Daly's work on histones is now considered fundamental.

Proteins and Nucleic Acids
Daly developed methods for separating out the nuclei of tissues and measuring the base composition of purines and pyrimidines in desoxypentose nucleic acids. She concluded, among other things, that "no bases other than adenine, guanine, thymine, and cytosine were present in appreciable amounts."

She investigated protein synthesis, including the role of cytoplasmic ribonucleoprotein in protein synthesis. Using radiolabeled amino acid glycine, she was able to measure how protein metabolism changed under feeding and fasting conditions in mice. This allowed her to monitor the activity of the cytoplasm as the radiolabeled glycine was taken up into the cell nucleus.

In 1953, Watson and Crick described the structure of DNA. Accepting the Nobel Prize for this work in 1962, Watson cited one of Daly's papers on "The role of ribonucleoprotein in protein synthesis" as contributing to his work. After 1953, the cell nucleus research field was flooded with funding opportunities.

Cholesterol and hypertension
Daly and her colleagues did some of the earliest work relating diet to the health of the cardiac and circulatory systems. They investigated the impact of cholesterol, sugar, and other nutrients. 
She was the first to establish that hypertension was a precursor to atherosclerosis, and the first to identify a relationship between cholesterol and clogged arteries, 
an important discovery in understanding how heart attacks occur.

She was especially interested in how hypertension affects the circulatory system. She showed that high cholesterol intake in diet led to clogged arteries, and that hypertension accelerated this effect. She studied the effects of diet on hypertension, and found that both cholesterol and sugar were related to hypertension.
Investigating aging, she suggested that smooth muscle hypertrophy due to aging might have a causative role in hypertension and atherosclerosis.
Daly was also an early investigator into the effects of cigarette smoke on the lungs and on hypertension.

Creatine
In the 1970s Daly began studying the uptake of creatine by muscle cells, an important research topic in the energy recycling systems of muscle. Her "Uptake of Creatine by Cultured Cells" (1980) described the conditions under which muscle tissues best absorbed creatine.

Personal life
There is limited information about her personal life and motivation for science. Daly's father, Ivan C. Daly, had immigrated from the British West Indies, found work as a postal clerk and eventually married Helen Page of Washington, D.C. They lived in New York City, and Daly was born and raised in Corona, Queens. She often visited her maternal grandparents in Washington, where she read about scientists and their achievements in her grandfather's extensive library. She was especially impressed by Paul de Kruif’s The Microbe Hunters, a work which influenced her decision to become a scientist.

Daly's interest in science was also influenced by her father, who had attended Cornell University with the intention of becoming a chemist, but had been unable to complete his education due to a lack of funds. Daly would thus complete her father's ambition by majoring in chemistry. Years later, she started a Queens College scholarship fund in his honor to assist minority students majoring in chemistry or physics.

Daly married and took the name Marie Maynard Daly Clark. Her husband died before her and they did not have any children. She died on October 28, 2003.

Legacy
On February 26, 2016, the founding principal of the new elementary school P.S.360Q, Mr. R. Emmanuel-Cooke, announced that the school would be named "The Dr. Marie M. Daly Academy of Excellence" in honor of the Queens resident. Additionally Einstein College also created an annual memorial lecture called The Marie M. Daly Memorial Celebration that is sponsored by the division of Biomedical Sciences and the Einstein Minority Scientist Association. Every year guest speakers are invited to give a lecture highlighting diversity and contribution of minorities to science.

Selected bibliography 
 
 
 </ref>

See also
 Timeline of women in science

References

1921 births
2003 deaths
African-American women academics
American women academics
African-American academics
American women biochemists
Hunter College High School alumni
Columbia University alumni
People from Corona, Queens
American women chemists
20th-century American women scientists
Columbia University faculty
Albert Einstein College of Medicine faculty
20th-century American chemists
Scientists from New York (state)
20th-century African-American women
20th-century African-American scientists
21st-century African-American people
21st-century African-American women